Blue Sky – Night Thunder is the fourth album by American singer-songwriter Michael Murphey and is considered one of the seminal albums of his career. Released in 1975, it produced two major hit singles—the platinum-certified "Wildfire" and "Carolina in the Pines"—and established him as a major force in popular music. Members of the Nitty Gritty Dirt Band provided backing on some of the tracks.

The album was Murphey's most successful and reached #18 on the Billboard album chart, eventually selling 800,000 US copies. It remains his most commercially successful album to date.

Track listing
 "Wildfire" (Murphey, Larry Cansler) – 4:47
 "Carolina in the Pines" (Murphey) – 3:54
 "Desert Rat" (Murphey) – 3:53
 "Wild Bird" (Murphey) – 2:24
 "Blue Sky Riding Song" (Murphey) – 3:32
 "Medicine Man" (Murphey, Murphey) – 3:49
 "Secret Mountain Hideout" (Murphey, Jac Murphey) – 3:56
 "Without My Lady There" (Murphey) – 2:33
 "Night Thunder" (Murphey) – 2:46
 "Rings of Life" (Murphey, Gary P. Nunn) – 3:18

Personnel
Music
 Michael Murphey – vocals, guitar, harmonica, piano
 John McEuen – banjo
 Jerry Mills – mandolin
 Sam Broussard – guitar
 Richard Dean – guitar, background vocals
 Jac Murphy – keyboards
 Tom Scott – saxophone
 Michael McKinney – bass, background vocals
 Harry Wilkinson – drums
 Tracy Nelson – background vocals
 Jeff Hanna – background vocals
 Jimmy Ibbotson – background vocals

Production
 Bob Johnston – producer
 Jeff Guercio – engineer

References

External links
 Michael Murphey's Official Website

1975 albums
Michael Martin Murphey albums
Albums produced by Bob Johnston
Epic Records albums